Jean-Philippe Durand (born 11 November 1960) is a French former professional footballer who played as a midfielder.

In his playing career, he played for Olympique Marseille and France at Euro 1992. Whilst at Marseille, he played in the victorious 1993 UEFA Champions League Final.

Honours
Marseille
Division 1: 1991–92
UEFA Champions League: 1992–93
Division 2: 1994–95

External links
 Illustrated profile
 
 

Living people
1960 births
Footballers from Lyon
Association football midfielders
French footballers
France international footballers
Toulouse FC players
FC Girondins de Bordeaux players
Olympique de Marseille players
Ligue 1 players
UEFA Euro 1992 players
UEFA Champions League winning players